2C-iP (also known as Jelena) is a relatively potent and long acting psychedelic phenethylamine and compound from the 2C family that was first synthesized by Dmitri Ger and has been sold online as a designer drug.

It is a structural analog of 2C-P.

Legality

Canada
As of October 31, 2016, 2C-iP is a controlled substance (Schedule III) in Canada.

See also
 2C-cP
 2C-D
 2C-E
 2C-T-4
 DOiPr

References

External links
PiHKAL entry #36
2C-iP entry in Isomerdesign

2C (psychedelics)
Designer drugs
Isopropyl compounds